Ribeira Grande (also: Povoação) is the largest town of the Ribeira Grande Municipality on the island of Santo Antão, Cape Verde. It has become a city in 2010. In 2010 its population was 2,564. It is situated in the northeastern part of the island, near the outflow of the river Ribeira Grande and its tributary Ribeira da Torre into the Atlantic Ocean. Neighborhoods include Tarrafal, Rua de Agua, Rua d'Horta and Penha de França.

History
Although the island was already discovered in 1462, the first evidence of settlement dates from 1548. The main settlement was Ribeira Grande, which became the seat of the municipality of Santo Antão in 1732.  

Its earlier buildings are built with Portuguese colonial architecture. The church of Nossa Senhora do Rosário is the parish church. 

Notable people includes chemist Roberto Duarte Silva, poet Manuel de Novas, and José Luís Jesus, former foreign minister and president of the International Tribunal for the Law of the Sea.

Demographics

References

Further reading

Carlos Ferrão, Estudos sobre a Ilha de Santo Antão (Studies on the Island of Santo Antão), Imprensa Nacional, Lisbonne, 1898, 116 pages 

Cities in Cape Verde
Populated coastal places in Cape Verde
Ribeira Grande Municipality
Geography of Santo Antão, Cape Verde
1732 establishments in the Portuguese Empire
Ports and harbours of Cape Verde